Əngəvül (also, Angevul and Angyavul’) is a village in the Yardymli Rayon of Azerbaijan.  The village forms part of the municipality of Noravar.

References 

Populated places in Yardimli District